Quantum Entanglement Science and Technology (QuEST) is a research program, announced by the DARPA Microsystems Technology Office (MTO) in 2008. As a follow-on to the QuIST Program, its goal was to further accelerate development in the field of quantum information science.

Example areas under investigation included:
 Shor's factoring algorithm, 
 Quantum machine learning, 
 Quantum game theory, 
 Secure quantum communications, 
 Quantum ghost imaging and interaction-free measurement, quantum image processing, 
 Remote sensing, quantum radar and quantum metrology, e.g. entanglement-assisted gravitomagnetic interferometry.

See also
 IARPA – Intelligence Advanced Research Projects Agency

References

External links 
 QuEST Program overview (archived web page)

DARPA projects